Blăjeni is a commune in Hunedoara County, Transylvania, Romania. It is composed of eight villages: Blăjeni, Blăjeni-Vulcan, Criș, Dragu-Brad, Groșuri, Plai, Reț and Sălătruc.

At the 2002 census, 100% of inhabitants were ethnic Romanians and 99.4% were Romanian Orthodox.

See also
Crișul Alb River
Țara Moților
Apuseni Mountains

Gallery

References

External links

Blăjeni Town Hall Website 
History of Blăjeni 
The Moţi meeting with history in Blăjeni and Dupăpiatră 
Blăjeni a pearl of the Apuseni 
Blăjeni commune, historical places and leading personalities 

Communes in Hunedoara County
Localities in Transylvania